Saint Helena is a British island in the South Atlantic.

Saint Helena may also refer to:

Saints
 Saint Helena, mother of Constantine I, Roman empress and the mother of Emperor Constantine I the Great
 Saint Helena of Skövde, Swedish twelfth-century saint
 Saint Helena of Serbia, medieval Queen of Serbia, died in 1314
 Saint Elen, often anglicized as Helen, late 4th-century founder of churches in Wales

Places

Atlantic Ocean 
Saint Helena (British Overseas Territory), officially known as 'Saint Helena, Ascension and Tristan da Cunha'

Australia 
St Helena, Victoria, a suburb of Melbourne
St Helena Island, Queensland
St Helena Tunnel, New South Wales

United States 
St. Helena, California
St. Helena AVA, California wine region in Napa Valley
St. Helena Parish, Louisiana
 St. Helena Island, Maryland
St Helena, Baltimore, Maryland
St. Helena, Nebraska
St. Helena, North Carolina
Saint Helena Island, South Carolina, a barrier island
Mount Saint Helena, California

Ships
, a British frigate in commission in the Royal Navy from 1944 to 1945
RMS St Helena (1963), a British Royal Mail Ship
RMS St Helena (1989), a British Royal Mail Ship
Saint Helena (1814), a packet schooner belonging to the British East India Company.
USS St. Helena (PF-86), the name briefly carried by  after her return to United States Navy custody in 1946

Schools 
Chesterfield St Helena School, High School for Girls in Chesterfield, England
St Helena School, Colchester, secondary school in Colchester, England
St Helena Secondary College, a High School in Victoria, Australia

Other uses
Saint Helena Medal, a French commemorative war medal established in 1857. 
St. Helena (solitaire), a solitaire card game
St Helena (play), a play by R. C. Sherriff
St Helena's Church (disambiguation)

See also
Santa Elena (disambiguation)
Sainte-Hélène (disambiguation)
Santa Helena (disambiguation)
St. Helen (disambiguation)
St Helens (disambiguation)